The 1971 San Diego mayoral election was held on November 2, 1971 to elect the mayor for San Diego. Incumbent Frank Curran stood for reelection for a third term. California State Assembly member Pete Wilson and former San Diego City Attorney Ed Butler received the most votes in the primary and advanced to the runoff. Wilson was then elected mayor with a majority of the votes.

Candidates
Pete Wilson, member of the California State Assembly
Ed Butler, former San Diego City Attorney
Jack Walsh, member of the San Diego County Board of Supervisors
Frank Curran, Mayor of San Diego
Dan Grady, consulting firm president
Tom Hom, former member of the California State Assembly and the San Diego City Council
Virginia Taylor, self-employed research analyst
Gilbert Robledo, sociology and Chicano studies instructor
Alan Littlemore, real estate agent
Mike Schaefer, member of the San Diego City Council
Arthur Mannion, county planner
William McKinley, real estate broker
Don Marsh, advertising director
Kenny Olson, business owner

Campaign
In October 1970, prior to the beginning of the campaign, incumbent Mayor Frank Curran and several other City officials were indicted for allegedly taking bribes from the Yellow Cab Company. He was acquitted on all charges prior to the election. Despite the controversy, Curran chose to run for reelection to a third term, hoping that reelection would serve as a public exoneration from his involvement in the case.

The 1971 election attracted a then-record 14 declared candidates. Five of Curran's challengers had previous experience in elected office, including California State Assembly member Pete Wilson, former San Diego City Attorney Ed Bulter, San Diego Board of Supervisors member Jack Walsh, former member of the Assembly and the San Diego City Council Tom Hom, and city council member Mike Schaefer. The remaining eight challengers were political outsiders running for their first elective office.

In the September 21, 1971 primary election, Wilson received more than twice as many votes his nearest competitor with 36.8 percent of the vote. Butler came in second place with 18.3 percent, followed by Walsh in third place with 16.2 percent of the vote, and Mayor Curran at 10.6 percent. None of the remaining ten candidates received more than five percent of the vote. 

Because no candidate received a majority of the vote, the top two vote-getters, Wilson and Butler, advanced to the runoff election scheduled for November 2, 1971. Wilson was then elected mayor with a majority of 61.7 percent of the votes.

Primary election results

General election

References

1971
1971 California elections
1971 United States mayoral elections
1971
November 1971 events in the United States